Theodosius was Patriarch of the Church of the East between 853 and 858.

Sources 
Brief accounts of the patriarchate of Theodosius are given in the Ecclesiastical Chronicle of the Jacobite writer Bar Hebraeus (floruit 1280) and in the ecclesiastical histories of the Nestorian writers Mari (twelfth-century), ʿAmr (fourteenth-century) and Sliba (fourteenth-century).  Modern assessments of Theodosius's reign can be found in Jean-Maurice Fiey's Chrétiens syriaques sous les Abbassides and David Wilmshurst's The Martyred Church.

Theodosius's patriarchate 
The following account of the patriarchate of Theodosius is given by Bar Hebraeus:

At the same time the catholicus Abraham died, after fulfilling his office for thirteen years, and was succeeded by Theodosius of Beth Garmai, who was consecrated at Seleucia on the second Sunday of Lent, in the year 238 of the Arabs [AD 853].  In his time the caliph al-Mutawakkil grew angry with his doctor Bokhtishoʿ, and threw him in jail, and confiscated all his possessions.  The catholicus was also imprisoned alongside him, and remained in chains for the space of three years.

After Theodosius, the catholicus of the Nestorians, left prison, he lived a further two years and then died, and was buried in the monastery of Klilishoʿ on 7 October in the year 1170 of the Greeks [AD 858].

See also
 List of patriarchs of the Church of the East

Notes

References 
 Abbeloos, J. B., and Lamy, T. J., Bar Hebraeus, Chronicon Ecclesiasticum (3 vols, Paris, 1877)
 Assemani, J. A., De Catholicis seu Patriarchis Chaldaeorum et Nestorianorum (Rome, 1775)
 Brooks, E. W., Eliae Metropolitae Nisibeni Opus Chronologicum (Rome, 1910)
 Fiey, J. M., Chrétiens syriaques sous les Abbassides, surtout à Bagdad (749–1258) (Louvain, 1980)
 Gismondi, H., Maris, Amri, et Salibae: De Patriarchis Nestorianorum Commentaria I: Amri et Salibae Textus (Rome, 1896)
 Gismondi, H., Maris, Amri, et Salibae: De Patriarchis Nestorianorum Commentaria II: Maris textus arabicus et versio Latina (Rome, 1899)
 Wilmshurst, David, The Martyred Church: A History of the Church of the East (London, 2011).
 Wright, W., A Short History of Syriac Literature (London, 1894).

External links 

858 deaths
Patriarchs of the Church of the East
Nestorians in the Abbasid Caliphate
Year of birth unknown
9th-century bishops of the Church of the East